Cyclohexylmethanol is an organic compound with the formula . It is a cyclohexane ring functionalized with an alcohol, specifically a hydroxymethyl group. The compound is a colorless liquid, although commercial samples can appear yellow.

Production
Cyclohexylmethanol can be produced in two step starting with the hydroformylation of cyclohexene. This process also give cyclohexane, resulting from hydrogenation.  The resulting cyclohexanecarboxaldehyde is then hydrogenated to give the alcohol.

References 

Hydroxymethyl compounds
Cyclohexyl compounds